Ognjen Valjić (born 20 May 1981) is a Bosnian professional football referee. He has been a full international for FIFA since 2011.

References 

1981 births
Living people
Bosnian football referees